(SEIDO), is the organized crime division of Mexico's Office of the Attorney General.

In October 2012, the organization changed its name from SIEDO to SEIDO.

History and Organization
SEIDO was formed in the wake of a 2003 scandal that found agents in the Attorney General's anti-narcotics prosecution office, FEADS, actively working for or protecting Mexican drug cartels. As a result, SEIDO was formed with 117 agents whose backgrounds and psychological profiles were intensely researched, in the hope that agents prone to Cartel corruption would be weeded out before they could enter the force.

See also

Attorney General of Mexico
Crime in Mexico
Drug Cartel
Federales
Grupo de Operaciones Especiales (Mexico)
Los Zetas
Los Negros
Gulf Cartel
Rurales

References

External links

Gendarmerie